The Baltimore Police Department plays an integral part in The Wire.

Command
The department is led by a Police Commissioner assisted by Deputy Commissioners of Operations (often shortened to Deputy Ops) and Administration. The Police Commissioner answers directly to the city mayor and outlines the departmental goals which are then enforced by the Deputy Commissioners. The Deputy Ops wields a great deal of power and is responsible for the day-to-day activity of the department's district and investigative unit commanders. 

The Administrative Deputy oversees the Internal Investigations Division (IID) and other units. The real life chain of command from the Commissioner downwards is Deputy Commissioner, Chief, Colonel, Lieutenant Colonel, Major, Captain, Lieutenant, Sergeant, and Detective/Officer. However, in the series, any mention of the ranks of Chief, Lieutenant Colonel, and Captain are omitted. Presumably this is to avoid confusion and make the relationships between different members of the hierarchy clearer to the viewer. 

Detectives fall into a rank that coincides with their administrative position. The Criminal Investigations Division (CID), commanded usually by a Colonel, is the division responsible for the Homicide unit, Narcotics unit, and Major Crimes Unit (MCU) among others. 

The IID, homicide unit, and narcotics unit are each led by a Major. MCU is commanded by a lieutenant. A Major commands each of the nine patrol districts - the Central, Northern, Northeastern, Eastern, Southeastern, Southern, Southwestern, Western and Northwestern districts.

Department commanders

William Rawls

Rawls is Acting Commissioner on a temporary basis. Rawls is Caucasian, and Mayor Tommy Carcetti is unwilling to attempt a permanent promotion fearing that it would not be acceptable to the politically influential and largely Black ministers. Rawls is a careerist and is feared by many of his subordinates. He has been known to punish anyone who crosses him with transfers to undesirable posts. Rawls is played by John Doman.

Cedric Daniels

Daniels is the Deputy Commissioner of Operations. He is a direct commanding officer of many of the show's characters in earlier seasons. Daniels previously worked as a lieutenant in the Eastern District Drug Enforcement Unit, CID Narcotics Unit, and was the first commander of the MCU. Daniels is promoted to Major and Western District Commander after his successful case work in the MCU. 

He draws Carcetti's attention as a young and capable Black commander and is quickly promoted to CID Colonel. He is eventually promoted to Police Commissioner, but resigns to practice law. Daniels is played by Lance Reddick.

Stanislaus Valchek

Valchek is the Deputy Commissioner of Administration. Valchek was previously the Southeastern District commander. His grudge against Frank Sobotka led to the formation of a specialised detail which became the Major Crimes Unit. Valchek is well-connected with the city's politicians, and was promoted because of his political association with Mayor Carcetti. Valchek is played by Al Brown.

Bobby Reed
Played by: Tony D. Head
Appears in:
Season one: "The Buys"; "Lessons" (uncredited); "The Hunt" and "Cleaning Up".
Season three: "Time After Time"; "Dead Soldiers"; "Reformation"; "Middle Ground" and "Mission Accomplished".
Season four: "Misgivings" (uncredited)

Reed is a Major in the Baltimore Police Department and commands the Internal Investigations Division. He is very loyal to Ervin Burrell's command, often more focused on protecting Burrell's status and command than on rigorously investigating individual officers. He often appears with discrediting evidence about officers for Burrell to use as blackmail.

In the first season Reed investigates the brutality charges made against Roland "Prez" Pryzbylewski for blinding a teenager in one eye. Reed dismisses the witnesses based upon their criminal records but suspends Prez from street duty pending a Grand Jury hearing. Reed then intervenes when the Barksdale detail stop State Senator Davis' driver (who received a bag full of cash from a Barksdale soldier) and again when Daniels tries to withhold the location of a Barksdale stash house to protect his investigation.

In the third season, Reed attends the weekly comstat meetings of Ervin Burrell and William Rawls. In the fourth season, Reed briefly appears when Burrell is contemplating the best method to keep his appointed position as commissioner.

Former members

Warren Frazier
Played by: Dick Stilwell
Appears in:
Season one: "The Hunt".
Frazier is the Commissioner in season one. He gives the order for citywide raids following the shooting of Kima Greggs. As actor Dick Stilwell died in a real-life car accident after appearing in this single episode, his character is retired and replaced by Ervin Burrell as commissioner.

Ervin Burrell

Burrell is a by-the-book careerist officer who reached the level of Commissioner. Initially appointed as an Acting Commissioner, Burrell negotiated for a permanent posting with the Royce administration. When Carcetti replaced Royce he immediately began looking to depose Burrell. He is eventually forced to resign in a scandal over manipulation of crime statistics but receives a highly paid replacement job in order to leave quietly. Burrell is played by Frankie Faison.

Raymond Foerster
Played by: Richard DeAngelis
Appears in:
Season one: "The Target"; "The Detail"; "The Buys"; "The Wire"; "The Cost"; "The Hunt" and "Sentencing".
Season three: "Time After Time "; " All Due Respect "; "Dead Soldiers"; "Straight and True"; "Homecoming"; "Slapstick" and "Mission Accomplished".
Season four: "Refugees"
Raymond Foerster was a Major and unit commander of the Baltimore narcotics division in season one. According to Season 4, he served 39 years on the force, suggesting he joined the BPD in 1967. When Judge Phelan questioned Deputy Commissioner Burrell about the Barksdale operation, Majors Foerster and Rawls faced his subsequent wrath and demands for more information. Foerster's response was to ask his shift lieutenant Cedric Daniels for a report and then to assign Daniels and his team to the Barksdale detail.

When Daniels's investigation became drawn out and relied upon wiretaps and surveillance, Foerster took the side of Deputy Commissioner Burrell against Daniels when he tried to explain the necessity of this technique to reach the heads of the organization. Foerster's and Burrell's insistence on using buy busts led to the operation that resulted in the shooting of Detective Greggs. Foerster visited Greggs in the hospital with many other command officers and appeared anxious when trying to find a tape recorder to replay the last transmissions before she was shot.

Foerster was promoted to colonel and took over as commander of the criminal investigations division when Rawls was promoted to deputy commissioner of operations. He was replaced as the Narcotics Major by George Smith, an associate of Major Colvin. He attended Rawls' weekly comstat meetings and worked with Sergeant Jay Landsman in running the homicide division. He was put under intense pressure to keep the murder rate down.

Foerster continued to command CID in season four and was involved in the management of the murder of a state's witness that became a politically important case. When Burrell ordered Foerster to replace veteran investigator Ed Norris with rookie homicide detective, Kima Greggs, Foerster realized that Burrell hoped to slow the investigation, assuming Burrell's intent was to prevent the investigation from revealing the victim's witness status as a possible motive for the murder before the upcoming mayoral election. Foerster argued with Burrell and Rawls about the decision and discussed it with Jay Landsman. 

Actor Richard DeAngelis suffered from cancer during this time and was often absent from work. Repeated courses of chemotherapy failed to cure the disease. DeAngelis died of cancer after filming scenes for the fourth season. Landsman announced the Colonel's death to the homicide unit, stating that he served 39 years in the department without leaving a trace of bitterness or hatred with any officers, a miraculous career by BPD standards. A police wake was held at an Irish bar in his honor.

Major Crimes Unit
The Major Crimes Unit was established by Cedric Daniels in season three as part of a prior agreement with Commissioner Ervin Burrell. The unit's main responsibility is to build cases against high-profile targets responsible for murder, drug distribution and money laundering in Baltimore. The unit was originally formed by a group of detectives dumped upon Daniels by shift Lieutenants to make a case against Avon Barksdale. It is currently under the command of the Criminal Investigation Division. It is run by Lester Freamon, even though on paper it is commanded by Lieutenant Asher.

In the first season the detail's office is located in the basement of a downtown building where the only redeeming features are working telephones and electricity. In the second season, the detail is moved into an old building located at 1911 South Clinton Street in the southeastern part of town, leased by the Transportation Authority courtesy of Major Valchek. The office remains the permanent location of the unit when it is formed in season three.

Current members

Command

Jimmy Asher
Played by: Gene Terinoni
Appears in:
Season four: "Boys of Summer"; "Home Rooms" and "That's Got His Own".
Season five: "More with Less"
Asher is the lenient lieutenant who was picked to command the Major Crimes Unit by Cedric Daniels. He normally lets the detectives do as they wish while working on his beach house in Delaware. Lieutenant Charles Marimow replaced him for purposes of properly "supervising" the Major Crimes Unit under the orders of Deputy Commissioner Rawls. With Daniels' promotion to C.I.D. colonel, Asher is reinstalled as commander of the unit again as Freamon feels he will effectively let the detectives do what they need to make a case without interference from the commissioner's office.

Lester Freamon

Freamon is a quiet and methodical veteran detective who makes major contributions to the unit's investigations. He is the unit's de facto commander, as he lays out their investigative strategies and specifically chose Lieutenant Asher to be the shift Lieutenant due to his lenient, hands-off attitude.

Detectives/Officers

Kenneth Dozerman
Played by: Rick Otto
Appears in:
Season three: "Time After Time", "All Due Respect" and "Back Burners".
Season four: "Refugees", "Alliances", "Know Your Place", "Misgivings", "That's Got His Own" and "Final Grades".
Season five: "More with Less", "Clarifications", "Late Editions", and "–30–".
Kenneth Dozerman is a plainclothes cop in the Western District. In season 3, he is part of Carver's Drug Enforcement Unit squad. He becomes friends with Herc and Carver while working in the squad accompanying them in various activities off duty. Dozerman gets shot in the face and critically injured in a buy bust operation gone wrong and gets decommissioned from duty for the rest of the season. Major Colvin uses Dozerman's shooting as the impetus for his "Hamsterdam" experiment, a way to reduce crime and not see any more of his men get hurt. The shooter also steals Dozerman's service weapon and Bunk Moreland is ordered to locate it. Dozerman is presented with it at a press conference.

In season four, Dozerman transfers to the Major Crimes Unit when Herc transfers in, filling the gap left by Greggs and Freamon leaving. Dozerman takes part in Lieutenant Charles Marimow's first series of failed raids as unit commander. Following these raids he helps Herc to set up video surveillance of Marlo Stanfield. Dozerman remains in the unit as an ally to both Herc and Leander Sydnor, who mentor Dozerman on his investigative strategies. All three detectives maintain a dislike for Marimow's caustic command style often fearing the repercussions that he has threatened them with. Dozerman remains in the unit following Marimow's departure and Herc's suspension under the new leadership of Lester Freamon.

In Season five, Dozerman is still with Major Crimes working with the detail on the row house serial murders. He still meets his old Western district DEU buddies for drinks along with Herc. After Major Crimes is disbanded, Dozerman is transferred to the Tactical division.

Jimmy McNulty

McNulty is known as “natural police” and ultimately whom the show centers around. He is dedicated and a highly driven Baltimore police detective but is riddled with many complicated personal problems, such as a ruined marriage, a series of flings with multiple women, and alcoholism. McNulty came up under the guidance of Bunny Colvin, a western district Major, who often  refers to McNulty as “Bushytop” for McNulty’s wavy or curly locks of hair. McNulty is liked by non-commanding officers and is most friendly to Bunk and Kima Greggs. The first three seasons foundation story revolves around McNulty’s obsession with arresting Stringer Bell.

Leander Sydnor

Sydnor is a young, married detective in the Baltimore Major Crimes Unit with a talent for investigative work and the stomach for drawn-out cases.  Sydnor has been part of the Major Crimes Unit throughout seasons one, three, and four of the show.

Former members

Command

Cedric Daniels

Daniels left the unit when he was promoted to Major, taking the District Commander post in the Western.

Charles Marimow
Played by: Boris McGiver
Appears in season four: "Home Rooms", "Refugees", "Alliances", "Corner Boys", "Misgivings", "That's Got His Own".
Bill Rawls installs Lieutenant Marimow as the commander of the Major Crimes Unit after Lester Freamon issues a series of subpoenas. Marimow attempts to change the unit's focus to the more obviously violent drug dealers and closes down their wiretaps on Marlo Stanfield. His caustic command style drives away Lester and Kima Greggs, leaving him with Leander Sydnor and Caroline Massey. His unit's staffing problems are relieved when Sergeant Herc Hauk transfers back. Dozerman joins him. Marimow and Herc develop an immediate mutual dislike.

Marimow is one of the most disliked commanders, often referred to as a "Trojan Horse", "Virus" and a "Unit Killer". It is stated by Jay Landsman that "Marimow does not cast off talent lightly. He heaves it away with great force". Marimow is also unafraid to threaten his subordinates' careers as a means of punishing them for insubordination or similar defiance. He prides himself on being a streetwise commander and having worked his way up through the ranks. While Marimow has worked hard to earn his rank, his hostile command style has established his negative reputation throughout the department.

He believes it would be easy to topple Marlo, but his first series of raids fail, as he underestimates his targets. Marimow orders his men to take Marlo down, leading Herc to break several rules by hiring a lip reader to spy on Marlo, and using a video camera without a court order or Marimow's approval. Marimow accurately suspects Herc of lying to him about the source of his information. 

Herc also has Internal Investigations Division (IID) complaints sent to the office for attempted arrests based on misinformation. Marimow vows to Herc that he would be happy to attend his "execution" at an IID trial if he could prove he was lying. Marimow leaves the Unit when Cedric Daniels becomes the Criminal Investigations Division colonel and reinstalls Lester and Asher.

Show creator David Simon left the Baltimore Sun after a bitter feud with editor William K. Marimow.  Simon chose to name an unsympathetic character after his old enemy.

Thomas "Herc" Hauk

Herc was a narcotics detective but his tendency towards brutality and acting without thinking held up his career progression as a member of the Barksdale and Sobotka details. To improve his chances of making sergeant he transferred to the Mayor's security detail. He returned to the Major Crimes Unit as a newly promoted sergeant. Herc is fired from the department after an Internal Investigation Division hearing.

Detail members

Ellis Carver

A detective on Daniels narcotics shift who followed him into the Barksdale and Sobotka details. He left the detail in season 2 for a drug enforcement unit sergeant posting in the Western District.

Patrick Mahon
Played by: Tom Quinn
Appears in season one: "The Detail"; "The Buys" and "Old Cases".
Mahon was an elderly detective from the property unit who briefly worked with the Barksdale detail. Dubbed as a departmental "hump", he and his partner Polk had not made a single case in property crimes over their last ten years. The two were also regarded as a pair of drunks who were incapable of driving soberly. 

He is punched by Bodie Broadus, a young drug dealer, when the detail raid the low rise projects. Mahon takes early retirement following his injury, and is last seen encouraging Polk to do the same.
Along with his counterpart Polk, his name is a reference to the Irish phrase "póg mo thóin" ("pogue mahone"), or "kiss my arse".

Augustus Polk
Played by: Nat Benchley
Appears in
Season one: "The Detail"; "The Buys"; "Old Cases"; "The Pager" and "The Wire".
Season two: "Collateral Damage" (uncredited) and "Hot Shots" (uncredited).
Season five: "Late Editions".
Polk was an aging detective from the property unit who worked briefly in the Barksdale and Sobotka details. He is often called "Auggie" by his partner Pat Mahon. He is generally regarded as a "hump", since he has not made a single case in property crimes over their last ten years. He is also an alcoholic.

After his partner Mahon retired due to injury, Polk considers deliberately injuring himself to follow in his partner's footsteps. Unable to follow through on his plan, he becomes despondent and goes on a drinking binge. He misses several days' work and finally shows up drunk at 9am. Lieutenant Daniels tells him to take sick leave for his alcohol problem or work "wet". Polk opted for sick leave and is off until the case is closed.

In the second season, he is briefly assigned to the first Sobotka detail under Lieutenant Grayson. When Major Valchek complains about the unit being full of humps, Daniels is put in command and Polk is moved back to property.

In the ninth episode of the fifth season, Polk makes a small cameo, as the officer running the evidence control locker in one of the precincts. After helping Commissioner Daniels locate a crucial piece of evidence, Daniels tells Polk that he's "glad he landed okay". Displaying his usual sarcasm, Polk replies "Yeah...beats working".

Michael Santangelo

For a full character description see Western District section, below.

Original Barksdale detail member partnered with Jimmy McNulty. He was dumped from homicide by Major Rawls for refusal to act as an insider in on Rawls' behalf. Santangelo took a post driving the narcotics wagon in the Western District.

Unit members

Shakima "Kima" Greggs

Daniels' protege who mentored Herc and Carver while in Narcotics. She transferred to homicide when Lieutenant Marimow came into the unit as he was a caustic commander who was difficult to work for. When Marimow left, she remained in homicide due to the higher pay.

Roland "Prez" Pryzbylewski

Prez was the son-in-law of deputy commissioner Stan Valchek who had a knack for tracing phone patterns and money accounts but was inept on the streets. Prez left the department after accidentally shooting a plainclothes black officer Derrick Waggoner. He becomes a teacher at Tilghman Middle School soon after.

Caroline Massey
Played by: Joilet F. Harris
Appears in
Season three: "Time After Time"; "All Due Respect"; "Dead Soldiers"; "Reformation" and "Middle Ground".
Season four: "Boys of Summer"; "Soft Eyes"; "Refugees".
Officer Massey joined the show in season three as a member of the Major Crimes Unit under Lieutenant Cedric Daniels. Massey is a world-weary officer with a penchant for sarcasm and cutting coupons. She was particularly adept at deciphering the slang used by Barksdale drug dealers on wiretaps of cellular phones. Her diligent work manning wiretaps earned the respect of Lester Freamon when she was part of his successful undercover operation to supply pre-wiretapped phones to the Barksdale organization.

In season four, Massey continued to work with the Major Crimes Unit and settled into her role. When the unit was assigned Lieutenant Marimow as a commander, Freamon transferred out. Massey and Sydnor were left to face Marimow closing down their wiretaps and ordering raids on weeks old targets.

Homicide unit
The Homicide Unit of the Baltimore City Police Department is responsible for the investigation of all unexplained deaths that take place within Baltimore City.  They are also responsible for investigating all police-related shootings. Because the homicide unit is generally regarded as containing the best detectives on the police force, they are often given high-profile cases which are not necessarily homicides. 

A clearance rate of 50% or more for the year is aimed for and the unit is among the most demanding in the Criminal Investigations Division. Sergeant Landsman's squad is typically the focus of the show, though there is at least one other squad (according to David Simon's book, there are typically three homicide squads in Baltimore, on rotating shifts). The unit is under the C.I.D. supervision of Rawls in season 2, then Raymond Foerster from the start of season 3 until Foerster's death from cancer, at which point the role is taken over by Cedric Daniels.

Like the real department described in David Simon's Homicide: A Year on the Killing Streets, the unit uses a red-black system of tracking cases where red is the color for an open/not cleared case and black is the color for a closed/cleared case. Additionally similar slang such as "dunkers" (easy cases), "whodunits" (difficult cases), and "redball" (media attention gaining cases) are used to describe the various cases.  Victims who are not associated with the drug trade or other crime are often referred to as "taxpayers".

A running practical joke within the unit is that if a detective is caught sleeping at his desk, his necktie will be cut off with scissors and pinned to a "necktie mausoleum". Detectives often fall asleep in the office (or on stakeout) because of the overtime demands and have at times worked double and triple shifts as they have dealt with multiple murders. This is used most prominently in the third season, where Bunk is shown cutting Crutchfield's tie, and later Crutchfield gets to repay the favor.

Current members

Jay Landsman

Landsman is a squad sergeant in the homicide unit who must divide his loyalties between his men and his superiors.

Frank Barlow

Played by: Michael Stone Forrest
Appears in:
Season one: "The Target"
Season five: "Not for Attribution", "Took" (uncredited), "Clarifications"
Frank Barlow is a Caucasian detective in the homicide unit who first appeared as the primary detective at the trial of D'Angelo Barksdale. Despite having two witnesses, D'Angelo is found not guilty due to witness intimidation in the court room. Barlow appears later in the series with open murders of homeless men that McNulty ties into his fabricated serial killer. 

Barlow then sees that McNulty is falsifying paper work on the homeless murders case to provide resources for detectives to investigate unrelated cases. Barlow blackmails McNulty into providing funds for him to take a long weekend to play golf in South Carolina.

Christeson

Played by: Dennis Hill
Appears in:
Season five: "More with Less", "Took", "Clarifications", "Late Editions" and "–30–".
Christeson is a young Black detective who is the homicide unit's newest detective. He first appears assisting Bunk and Norris on a "polygraph-by-copier" where an idiotic suspect confesses to a homicide. Christeson is the first detective whom Jimmy McNulty covers for the "homeless killer" and he is granted overtime to solve a case which the department's upper command interferes with.

Michael Crutchfield

Played by: Gregory L. Williams
Appears in:
Season three: "Back Burners", "Moral Midgetry", "Slapstick" and "Mission Accomplished".
Season four: "Home Rooms", "Soft Eyes", "Refugees", "Alliances", "Margin of Error", "Unto Others", "Corner Boys", "A New Day" and "Final Grades".
Season five: "More With Less", "Unconfirmed Reports", "Not for Attribution", "Took", "Clarifications", and "–30–".
Crutchfield is a detective in the homicide unit whose name is mentioned earlier in the series but who does not appear on screen until season three. He was the primary detective at the murder that took place in Major Colvin's "free zone" and withheld the investigation at Colvin's request. Colvin then helped create a "dunker" case having his suspect turned in after threatening the drug dealers in the "free zone".

In season four, Crutchfield plays a bigger role, appearing with Vernon Holley getting an identification of Omar Little as a murder suspect from Old Face Andre. When Bunk Moreland wants to re-examine the case, Crutchfield displays his anger over Bunk wanting to reverse one of his clearances. Crutchfield then promises to reverse a clearance of Bunk's as payback for going back on a solved case. 

When Carver leaves a message for Bunk, Crutchfield deliberately throws it away, causing a lengthy delay in the discovery of the bodies being left all over the city by the Stanfield Organization, and also indirectly ruining Randy Wagstaff's life in the process. Crutchfield ends season four investigating murders at the hands of the Stanfield Organization.

In season five Crutchfield remains with Sergeant Jay Landsman's homicide squad. Crutchfield helps Bunk to manipulate a confession from DeShawn Williams. Crutchfield buys Monell, another involved party, a McDonald's meal and parades the boy in front of Bunk's interrogation room to lead Bunk's suspect to believe that his friend had turned against him. When departmental cut backs lead to the withholding of overtime, Crutchfield secures part-time work as a security guard to replace his lost pay. Crutchfield is later assigned along with Kima Greggs to Chris Partlow and Snoop's triple murder of Junebug, Junebug's partner, and bodyguard. He is last seen watching as Kenard is being placed in the back of a squad car, presumably having arrested him for the murder of Omar Little.

According to Homicide: A Year on the Killing Streets, there was actually a Caucasian detective in the Baltimore Police Department homicide division named Michael Crutchfield.

Shakima "Kima" Greggs

Greggs is a tenacious investigator and a rookie homicide detective. She was a key member of the Major Crimes Unit and proved herself on both the Barksdale and Sobotka investigations. She struggles to balance her life as a police officer with her role as a potential mother with her partner.

Vernon Holley

Played by: Brian Anthony Wilson
Appears in:
Season one: "The Wire" and "The Hunt".
Season two: "Port in a Storm" (uncredited).
Season three: "All Due Respect" (uncredited), "Dead Soldiers", "Hamsterdam"; "Slapstick"; "Reformation" and "Mission Accomplished".
Season four: "Soft Eyes", "Alliances", "Margin of Error", "Unto Others", "Corner Boys", "A New Day" and "Final Grades".
Season five: "React Quotes", "The Dickensian Aspect", "Took", and "–30–".

Holley is a detective in the homicide unit under the command of Bill Rawls, and later Raymond Foerster followed by Cedric Daniels. Holley often works with Norris, Bunk, or Crutchfield and is one of the unit's more short tempered and physically intimidating detectives. He first appears with partner Ed Norris and catches the case of the murder of Omar Little's boyfriend Brandon. They recognize a connection to the recent murder of Omar's crew member Bailey because both corpses are found in Kevlar vests. They call in Jimmy McNulty and the Barksdale detail's work secured a conviction for the murder against soldier Wee-Bey Brice.

Following the shooting of detective Kima Greggs, Holley tracks down Bubbles paging her from a payphone. Holley assumes he is a suspect and has uniformed officers bring him in for an interrogation. Believing Bubbles to be the shooter, Holley tries to interrogate Bubbles in an accusatory and threatening manner. When Bubbles is unable to respond to his questions, Holley quickly loses his temper and tries to beat a confession out of him. Once McNulty intervenes, the situation is cleared up and Holley lies about Bubbles trying to attack him as a means of justifying the beating.

In season two, Holley is briefly seen investigating the murder of Frank Sobotka.

In season three he is assigned to investigate the murder of Tosha Mitchell and Tank and later the shooting of Stringer Bell, both working with Bunk Moreland. During this season, he is also seen called to duty for other investigations as the city's homicide rate rapidly approaches 300 murders for the year.

In season four, Holley initially works as the secondary investigator on Norris' case of a murdered state's witness named Braddock that becomes a "red ball" case. Later in that investigation, he is replaced by Kima Greggs for political reasons. Holley and Crutchfield are then seen catching the case of a delivery woman murdered by Chris Partlow in Old Face Andre's convenience store. They interview Andre, who quickly (as ordered by Chris) identifies Omar Little as the killer in a photo array.

When Omar is arrested he manages to convince Bunk Moreland he is innocent and Bunk asks Crutchfield and Holley to re-open the case. Crutchfield refuses to entertain the idea but Holley agrees that Andre is a possible drug dealer and goes with Bunk to the crime scene reluctantly. At the scene revisitation, Bunk views evidence confirming Omar's innocence in the shooting.

He states that Andre's store is a drug stash house, Andre's story makes no sense, and in addition to his fear of Chris, he was likely willing to implicate Omar for ripping off his stash. Holley and Bunk then reappear with a grand jury summons where at the courtroom, Holley manages to intimidate Andre both physically and legally to have him confess his role in lying about the murder. Holley ends Season 4 assisting Crutchfield, Norris, and Bunk in the investigations of murders caused by Marlo Stanfield's crew.

According to Homicide: A Year on the Killing Streets, there was actually a Black detective in the Baltimore Police Department homicide division named Vernon Holley. The real life Holley has worked in security for the Baltimore Ravens.

William "Bunk" Moreland

Bunk is a well liked and proficient member of the homicide unit. Although he is a capable detective, Bunk is a known alcoholic with a penchant for infidelity.

Ed Norris

Played by: Ed Norris
Appears in:
Season one: "The Wire", "The Cost", "The Hunt" and "Sentencing".
Season two: "Stray Rounds"
Season three: "Time After Time", "All Due Respect" and "Dead Soldiers".
Season four: "Boys of Summer", "Soft Eyes", "Alliances" (uncredited), "Margin of Error", "Unto Others", "A New Day" and "Final Grades".
Season five: "More With Less", "Transitions", "React Quotes", "The Dickensian Aspect" (uncredited), "Took", and "–30–".
Norris is a homicide detective who has been in the unit for 15 years since 1991 according to Season 4. Norris and his squad mate Vernon Holley first appeared assigned to the case of the murder of Omar Little's boyfriend Brandon. They recognized a connection to the recent murder of Omar's crew member Bailey because both corpses were found in Kevlar vests. They called in their colleague Jimmy McNulty and the Barksdale detail's work secured a conviction for the murder against soldier Wee-Bey Brice.

Norris was also lead detective on the shooting of Wendell "Orlando" Blocker and Kima Greggs this time working with Detective Ray Cole. This case was also solved when Wee-Bey confessed to the shooting.

In season two he appeared briefly when investigating the shooting of a child by a stray bullet. In season three he attended the wake of his colleague Ray Cole. Norris remains with the homicide unit in season four when he is the lead investigator in the politically important murder of a state's witness. He is briefly taken off the case and replaced with Greggs, now a rookie in the squad, in order to slow progress because of pressure from the Mayor. Norris is soon reinstated when this story is leaked to the press. 

He works alongside Greggs to maintain a coverup story that they were always working together. Norris secures an informant for the witness murder, but his attempt to break the story right before the election leads to him and Greggs being sent off to a security detail at a polling station for the day. Norris continues to pursue this lead after the election, however Greggs solves the case with a careful recanvassing of the crime scene before he is able to make progress. She earns Norris' respect with her work although he responds to the knowledge that the shooting was random with incredulity because of the political ramifications it had.

Norris is played by ex-police commissioner of Baltimore and convicted felon Ed Norris. His cameo appearances are a source of irony on the show, and he is often given dialogue bemoaning the state of the Baltimore Police Department.

Winona

Appears in:
Season two: "Ebb Tide", "Hard Cases"
Season three: "Dead Soldiers", Mission Accomplished (uncredited)
Season four: "Soft Eyes", "Refugees", "Corner Boys"; "Know Your Place", "A New Day", "Final Grades".

Winona is a recurring background character who maintains The Board at the offices of the BPD Homicide Division. She is a middle-aged black woman with a distinctive, bouffant hairdo. Detective McNulty greets her by name in episode 14.

Former members

Ray Cole
Played by: Robert F. Colesberry
Appears in:
Season one: "The Target" (uncredited); "The Detail" (uncredited); "The Wire" (uncredited); "The Cost" (uncredited); "The Hunt" (uncredited); "Sentencing" (uncredited).
Season two: "Ebb Tide" (uncredited); "Collateral Damage" (uncredited); "Undertow (uncredited); "Stray Rounds" (uncredited).
Ray Cole was a somewhat inept member of Sergeant Landsman's homicide squad under the command of William Rawls.

Cole was the lead investigator of the death of Anton "Stinkum" Artis. His colleague Bunk Moreland told him that there was information about the case as part of a wiretap investigation that Bunk's partner Jimmy McNulty was involved in. The information would jeopardize the wiretap so they promised they would give it to Cole when the case closed. McNulty never intended to give Cole the information because the perpetrator was his informant Omar Little.

Cole was secondary investigator on the shooting of Wendell "Orlando" Blocker and Detective Kima Greggs. Cole achieved a clearance in the case working alongside lead investigator Detective Ed Norris when the case was solved with a confession from Wee-Bey Brice.

Cole was initially assigned the fourteen Jane Doe homicides that Rawls had tried to avoid. Jimmy McNulty was responsible for proving the cases fell under Rawls' jurisdiction. McNulty called Cole collateral damage when discussing Cole's misfortune with Bunk. Landsman reassigned the case to Bunk and Lester Freamon because he felt he needed his most capable detectives on it.

Cole died unexpectedly and the department held a wake for him. Landsman gave a eulogy for Cole at the wake.

Cole was played by the show's executive producer, Robert F. Colesberry, who died unexpectedly of complications from heart surgery. The character's wake was in part a tribute to Colesberry.  In all subsequent seasons, the opening titles showed Cole's photo at the wake.

Lester Freamon

Freamon is a methodical detective who was very skilled at homicide investigations but was once kicked out of the unit for angering the Deputy of Operations. He was let back in by William Rawls on two occasions transferring out on both to be of more assistance in leading the Major Crimes Unit.

Freamon is a methodical and competent homicide detective who was exiled to the Pawn Shop Unit – for thirteen years (and four months) – for angering the then-Deputy of Operations. He was transferred to the Barksdale detail in Season One, later returning twice to the Homicide unit.

Jimmy McNulty

McNulty was one of the homicide unit's better detectives until his insubordination drew the ire of his commander Major Rawls. Rawls had him transferred out of homicide at the end of season one, although he did return in Season Five.

William Rawls

Rawls was a Major in homicide promoted to Criminal Investigations Division Colonel and then Deputy Commissioner of Operations. He was a ruthless and feared commander of the unit who expected nothing less than unwavering loyalty and competence from his detectives.

Western District
The Western District (along with the Eastern District as shown in Season 3) of the Baltimore Police Department is one of the city's most violent districts and is located in the middle of West Baltimore at 1034 North Mount Street. The Western District has been examined in greater depth than any other on The Wire and was the center of the major investigations in seasons one, three and four.

Current staff

Command
Currently, the Western District is administered by Major Dennis Mello, former deputy to Howard Colvin, who was forced into retirement.

Dennis Mello
Played by: Jay Landsman
Appears in:
Season 2: "Stray Rounds" (uncredited).
Season 3: "Time After Time"; "All Due Respect"; "Dead Soldiers"; "Hamsterdam"; "Straight and True"; "Homecoming"; "Back Burners"; "Reformation"; "Middle Ground" and "Mission Accomplished".
Season 4: "Boys of Summer"; "Margin of Error"; "Misgivings"; "A New Day"; "Final Grades".
Season 5: "More With Less", "Took"

Mello first appeared on the series as Western District administrative lieutenant and Major "Bunny" Colvin's second in command and confidante before Colvin's forced retirement. Mello then ran the district until Major Daniels was named district commander. Mello ran briefings for the Western district at roll call maintaining a sense of humor, typically dismissing the men with "don't get captured" and jokingly referring to them as "humps" and "mopes". 

Mello was once again given command of the Western district after Daniels' promotion to C.I.D. colonel, at least until a new Major is given district command. The actor who plays Dennis Mello is a retired Baltimore detective named Jay Landsman, and was the real-life basis for the character of the same name in the show.

Mello appeared with Colvin during the accidental shooting of a nine-year-old child after Colonel Rawls' command to shake down the district for all known drug dealers to get a murder suspect. Mello comments that it was too bad a child had to die before locking all the drug dealers up, while Colvin questions what it is they are really doing.

He accompanied Colvin to comstat meetings. Mello was aware of Colvin's "Hamsterdam" free zone where he allowed drug dealing to go unpunished. Mello was worried, but did not report Colvin's actions to his superiors. Colvin protected Mello following the discovery of Hamsterdam by their superiors. After Colvin's departure, Mello was temporarily promoted to Western District Commander. The two remained friends.

In season four Mello returned to his post of administrative lieutenant after Major Daniels was granted the district commander post. Mello worked closely with Daniels. The two tried to convince Officer McNulty to take a position in their operations unit. Both rated his capabilities highly but could not convince him to leave his position in patrol. Daniels, however, remembering McNulty's past insubordination, viewed McNulty's position as a patrolman as a self-redeeming job and was more understanding of McNulty's desire to work as a patrolman.

Mello was given command of the Western district again when Daniels was promoted to Criminal Investigations Division colonel. Mello continues to give charismatic roll call briefings including readying his men for polling station duty and introducing the murder warrant for Omar Little. When Commissioner Burrell tried to reassert his command of the force by "juking the stats", the district commanders were told to increase the number of arrests in their districts whether they be felonies or minor infractions.

After seeing his officers at work, he went to Daniels to discuss the orders patrol had been given. Mello was personally opposed to this statistical posturing, claiming that while the troops were increasing the minor infraction arrests, they were locking up the neighborhood people in the process. Claiming that half of his officers felt the same way, he then asked who they were doing this for as the election was over.

Daniels informed Mayor Carcetti, who then initiated a new order for the department to no longer make arrests based on statistical quotas but rather quality felonies, something Daniels had been lobbying for. Mello then was later seen commanding the Western troops to do the complicated (by Baltimore Police standards which Mello jokingly states is uncomplicated only if officers went to college or were born by women who did not drink alcohol while they were pregnant) task of searching empty homes for bodies at the request of former district major Cedric Daniels and detective Lester Freamon.

The character is named after a real-life Captain Dennis Mello, who was the Western District commander when Ed Burns was an officer.

Ellis Carver

Sergeant Carver is SIC (Sergeant in Charge) of the Western District under Major Mello. At the end of the series Carver is promoted to Lieutenant.

Uniformed Patrolmen

Brian Baker
Played by: Derek Horton
Appears in
Season three: "Time After Time"; "All Due Respect"
Season four: "Misgivings"; "A New Day" (uncredited).
Season five: "Took" (uncredited)
Baker is a rookie patrolman assigned with Castor to the Western District under the command of Bunny Colvin in Season three. He and Castor are both forced by Colvin to carry a compass until they can correctly identify the north direction. In Season four, Baker teams with officer Jimmy McNulty to arrest two people for a string of felony church burglaries. McNulty allows him credit for the arrest, later concurring with Bunk Moreland that Baker could be "good police".

Bobby Brown
Played by: Bobby J. Brown
Appears in
Season one: "The Target" (uncredited); "The Wire" (uncredited)  and "The Cost" (uncredited).
Season three: "Middle Ground" (uncredited).
Season four: "Refugees"; "Know Your Place"; "Misgivings"; "A New Day"  (uncredited).
Season five: "More With Less"; "Unconfirmed Reports"; "Clarifications"; "Late Editions"; and "–30–".
Bobby Brown is a Western District uniformed officer. He was the first officer on scene at the shooting of William Gant. He was also at the Brandon Wright crime scene. Detective Jimmy McNulty later enlisted Brown to help watch the home of Wallace. In season 3 when Major Colvin institutes the Hamsterdam initiative Brown is one of the officers freed up to be assigned to investigate complaints rather than perform radio car patrols and he solves a church burglary case.

Brown was later present with Sergeant Ellis Carver to both warn and arrest Namond Brice for selling drugs on a pre-indicted corner. In season five Brown is livid about the withholding of his overtime pay and is insubordinate in Carver's first roll-call briefing as Sergeant in charge. Brown is involved in a parking lot brawl with another officer over the poor state of a vehicle he hands over.
 Later, Brown is the first officer at a suspicious death that is investigated by Detective McNulty—the death is later ruled natural as predicted by Brown and McNulty.
Brown's character is the same Baltimore police officer also called Bob Brown, played by the same featured in David Simon's miniseries, The Corner. Bobby J. Brown is also featured in The Corner as another officer. Brown would later portray real-life, corrupt BPD Sergeant Thomas Allers in another of Simon's series, and the “spiritual successor” to The Wire, We Own This City.

Aaron Castor
Played by: Lee E. Cox
Appears in
Season three: "Time After Time"; "All Due Respect" and "Moral Midgetry" (uncredited)
Season five: "More With Less"; "Unconfirmed Reports"
Castor is a rookie patrolmen, assigned with Baker to the Western District under the command of Howard Colvin in season three. He and Baker are both ordered by Colvin to carry a compass until they can correctly identify the north direction. He is apparently the nephew of former Baltimore Police officer Lloyd Castor, whom Major Colvin has dubbed as "good police". In season five Castor is first seen warning his new Major, Dennis Mello, about a brawl in the district parking lot. Later, Castor is the first officer attending the triple homicide of Junebug and his wife and associate, investigated by Detective Kima Greggs. Castor fails to notice a child hiding in a closet when he secures the scene and Greggs hears the child when she arrives.

Michael Santangelo
Played by: Michael Salconi
Appears in
Season one: "The Target"; "The Detail"; "The Buys"; "Old Cases"; "The Wire"; "One Arrest"; "Game Day"; "The Cost"; "The Hunt"; "Cleaning Up" and "Sentencing".
Season two: "Port in a Storm".
Season three: "Dead Soldiers"; "Straight and True"; "Homecoming"; "Slapstick" and "Mission Accomplished".
Season four: "Boys of Summer"; "Margin of Error"; "Misgivings"; "A New Day".
Season five: "Transitions", "Took", and "–30–".

Mike "Sanny" Santangelo is an Italian American officer responsible for driving the district arrest van in the Western District.

In season one, Santangelo is an eight-year veteran in the Homicide Unit. Santangelo is, along with McNulty, assigned to the Barksdale detail by Rawls, to spy on McNulty. This also allows Rawls to unburden himself of one of his more inept homicide detectives, as Santangelo has a clearance rate of less than 40%, with his excuse for his performance being a lack of easy cases. He tries to resist, saying that it isn't his job to inform on a fellow cop. Rawls orders him either to solve one of his open cases, all of which are difficult cases, inform on McNulty or leave the Homicide Unit altogether. 

Landsman eventually recommends a psychic, "Madame LaRue", and Santangelo, in desperation, follows her instructions to bury a doll in the murder victim's grave. That evening, McNulty solves another of the open cases, and Santangelo, though pleased, doesn't understand why a different case was solved. Landsman tells him that the psychic was meant as a joke and that Bunk and McNulty did his work for him. With the clearance, Santangelo is able to refuse Rawls' demands and is grateful enough to tell McNulty that Rawls wants him fired.

Santangelo is demoted to patrol officer at the end of season one for failing to give Rawls any more information. In season two, he is seen briefly as a beat officer, arresting Bubbles and Johnny when they try to steal medical supplies from an ambulance. In season three, he drives the Western district prisoner transport vehicle under the command of Major Colvin. When he encounters former Barksdale detail members McNulty and Kima Greggs, Santangelo mentions that he is happy at being a patrolman as his job is easier: he is no longer a detective, he no longer deals with difficult commanders like Rawls and still takes home the same pay and pension contributions.

He remains a patrolman in the Western District in season four, when McNulty transfers in alongside him. During a counter-terrorism seminar, he was the first officer to point out the uselessness of Western District officers learning anti-terrorism tactics in a crime-ridden district. Santangelo is also one of several officers present for the arrest of Omar Little on a murder warrant.

Eddie Walker
Played by: Jonnie Louis Brown
Appears in: Season four: "Soft Eyes"; "Refugees"; "Margin of Error"; "Unto Others"; "Misgivings"; "A New Day".
Walker is a corrupt Black patrolman in the Western District. He is a violent bully, who is feared and loathed by Namond, Michael, and the other young drug dealers in the area, and several times is seen brutalizing them. He is first seen stealing money from Randy. Later he steals bootleg DVDs from Bubbles, after Bubbles attempted to report a robbery. He is the arresting officer for Omar Little, stealing a ring from him in the process. 

After Walker breaks Donut's fingers for giving him more paper work to do after a car chase, Michael orchestrates an act of revenge. When Walker exits a club late one night, Dukie runs down the sidewalk keying cars. Walker chases him into an alley, where Michael and Namond are waiting for him. Michael makes Walker drop to his knees at gunpoint and sees the ring that Walker stole from Omar (who stole it from Marlo, who took it from Old Face Andre); he takes it before Namond drenches Walker with paint. Walker tells fellow officers that he was attacked by Bloods. 

Walker's attitude earns him the respect of more zealous officers and the disdain of others, such as Jimmy McNulty. McNulty later describes Walker as an "asshole", while talking to Bodie Broadus.

Plainclothes Officers

Anthony Colicchio
Played by: Benjamin Busch
Season three: "Time After Time"; "All Due Respect"; "Dead Soldiers"; "Hamsterdam"; "Straight and True"; "Homecoming"; "Back Burners"; "Moral Midgetry"; "Slapstick" and "Mission Accomplished".
Season four: "Boys of Summer"; "Alliances" (uncredited); "Margin of Error"; "Misgivings"; "That's Got His Own" and "Final Grades".
Season five: "More With Less", "Transitions"

Anthony "Tony" Colicchio is a narcotics officer in Sergeant Ellis Carver's drug enforcement unit squad in the Western District of Baltimore. He was often partnered with fellow squad members Herc Hauk and Lloyd "Truck" Garrick. Colicchio is part of the operation that resulted in the shooting of Officer Dozerman. Along with the rest of the squad, Colicchio is involved in policing drug tolerant zones set up by his district commander Major Colvin without the knowledge of his superiors. It is Colicchio who inspires the name Hamsterdam, after citing Amsterdam's liberal drug laws as a metaphor for Colvin's new policies. As Colicchio is zealously committed to using brute force to fight the war on drugs, he describes the drug-free zones as "moral midgetry."

Colicchio remains in Carver's squad in season four, and Carver tries to bring him around to his new way of doing things—getting to know the street dealers and cultivating informants. Colicchio takes part in Lieutenant Marimow's failed raids in the Western district. Colicchio is also present for the arrest of Omar Little on a murder warrant, relishing finally bringing in the legendary criminal. 

With his overzealous attitude, Colicchio is delighted to participate in the arrest hike ordered by Commissioner Burrell to appease the city's politicians. He appears outside a bar with other officers, causing a near riot with their "quality of life violation" arrests against people with open alcohol containers. (Major Colvin had compared "Hamsterdam" to the practice of not enforcing violations of open-container laws when the bottles were obscured by paper bags.) Colicchio's method of policing supports the Broken Windows Theory.

In season five, Colicchio remains in the Western District drug enforcement unit and continues to take a combative approach to his work. He is the subject of an Internal Investigation Division investigation after he attacks a teacher who had asked him to move a vehicle while he was making an arrest. Carver refuses to back Colicchio when he shows no remorse for his action, and charges him with conduct unbecoming an officer and excessive force. Colicchio accuses Carver of being a rat, but Carver is not deterred by the damage to his reputation.

Colicchio is played by Benjamin Busch, who spent two tours of duty in Iraq with the U.S. Marine Corps.

Lloyd "Truck" Garrick
Played by: Ryan Sands
Appears in:
Season three: "Time After Time"; "All Due Respect"; "Homecoming"; "Back Burners"; "Moral Midgetry"; "Slapstick"; "Reformation" and "Mission Accomplished".
Season four: "Boys of Summer"; "Alliances"; "Margin of Error"; "Corner Boys"; "Know Your Place"; "Misgivings"; "A New Day"; "That's Got His Own" and "Final Grades".
Season five: "More With Less"; "Clarifications"; "Late Editions"
Lloyd "Truck" Garrick is a Black narcotics officer in Sergeant Ellis Carver's squad in the Western District of the Baltimore Police Department, often partnered with fellow squad members Herc, Lambert and Colicchio. Garrick was part of the operation that resulted in the shooting of Officer Dozerman. Along with the rest of the squad Garrick was involved in policing drug tolerant zones set up by his district commander Howard "Bunny" Colvin without the knowledge of his superiors. He was with Herc when he phoned the paper to report Colvin's actions and again when he met with a reporter.

In season 4, Truck appeared briefly at a useless lesson for Western police on counter-terrorism, and once while assisting Herc and Carver. In Season 5, Truck appears with the Western District officers who are frustrated by the lack of overtime pay due to city cutbacks. During Detective Jimmy McNulty's homeless killer case, McNulty has Western District Sergeant Ellis Carver detail officers to track Marlo Stanfield's crew including officers Brown, Dozerman, and Truck.

Lambert
Played by: Nakia Dillard
Appears in:
Season three: "Time After Time"; "All Due Respect"; "Homecoming"; "Back Burners"; Reformation.
Lambert is a Black narcotics officer in Sergeant Ellis Carver's Drug Enforcement Unit in the Western District of the Baltimore Police Department, often seen with fellow squad members Herc, Anthony Colicchio, and Lloyd "Truck" Garrick. He was part of the operation that resulted in the shooting of Officer Dozerman. After Dozerman's shooting the D.E.U.'s hand-to-hand operations were suspended as Major Colvin did not want to see any more of his men come close to death over a minimal amount of drugs.

Former staff

Major Howard "Bunny" Colvin

Colvin was the veteran Major and District commander who was forced out of the department due to his "Hamsterdam" experiment that de-criminalized drugs, despite this causing a reduction in felonies.

Kenneth Dozerman
Dozerman was a friend of Carver and Herc in the DEU that moved into the Major Crimes Unit in season 4.

Thomas "Herc" Hauk

A former D.E.U. member who was a partner of Ellis Carver. He left the Western District to work on the Mayor's security detail.

Jimmy McNulty

McNulty was a former beat officer who became a detective. He returned to patrol in season 4 but after the death of an informant, he rejoined the Homicide Unit.

Others
The following are former officers or assistant police not part of a District, Administrative, or Criminal Investigation Division.

Walter Cantrell
Played by: Dave Trovato
Appears in
Season one: "The Detail" and "Sentencing" (uncredited).
Season four: "Unto Others" (uncredited).
Walter Cantrell is a major and the Southern District commander. He is first seen in season one where he is a lieutenant and commands Roland "Prez" Pryzbylewski and Leander Sydnor. Lieutenant Cedric Daniels bargains with Cantrell to have the highly competent Sydnor assigned to the Barksdale detail to compensate for taking the erratic Pryzbylewski. Cantrell and Daniels are both candidates for the next post of major, and because of Daniels' insubordination while conducting the Barksdale investigation, Cantrell receives the promotion at the end of the first season. He is seen again in season four commanding the Southern District and preparing new mayor Tommy Carcetti for a ride-along.

Claude Diggins
Played by: Jeffrey Fugitt
Appears in season two: "Ebb Tide"; "Collateral Damage"; "Undertow"; "All Prologue"; "Duck and Cover"; "Storm Warnings" and "Port in a Storm".
Diggins is a Baltimore police department Marine Unit officer who partners with Jimmy McNulty when he is assigned to the unit. He advises McNulty on how to make the best of the situation, but McNulty hates the fumes. Diggins is forgiving of McNulty's time away from the unit and shares his own boat with Bunk Moreland and McNulty to pose as a fishing craft when observing Spiros "Vondas" Vondopoulos. He has a noticeable Baltimore accent.

Randall Frazier
Played by: Erik Todd Dellums
Appears in
Season one: "The Detail"; "The Wire"
Season two: "Collateral Damage"; "Hot Shots" and "All Prologue"
Season three: "All Due Respect"
Frazier is a Baltimore police department medical examiner. He is involved in the investigation of the death of William Gant. Later he was responsible for the autopsies of fourteen unidentified women found at the Baltimore docks. He helped Jimmy McNulty to prove that the deaths occurred in the city jurisdiction, by establishing their time of death based upon the air supply in the container the bodies were discovered in. He also linked the bodies to a specific plastic surgery clinic by identifying a breast implant type that several of the women shared and tracing the serial number. This information helped the detectives to establish that the women were sex trade workers.

Beadie Russell

Russell is a port authority police officer and a single mother who develops an interest in case work following a chance discovery. She also develops a relationship with Jimmy McNulty in seasons 4 and 5.

Marvin Taylor
Played by: Barnett Lloyd
Appears in
Season three: "Time After Time"; "All Due Respect"; "Dead Soldiers"
Taylor is a Black Major who was the acting commander of the Eastern District. Under pressure from the Mayor's office, Ervin Burrell is told to start coming down on the department to reduce the crime rate by any means possible. As Taylor's district had a low number of felony arrests and handgun confiscations in addition to a high number of homicides in a very short period of time, Deputy Rawls angrily tells him that he had eight hours to get a grip on his district or he would be fired. 

Cedric Daniels and Jimmy McNulty then arrested an eastside drug dealer named "Cheese" whom they suspect of being responsible for some of the murders in his district. When insufficient evidence against "Cheese" or any other suspected murderers is present, Rawls berates him one last time at a Comstat meeting, after which Commissioner Burrell relieves Taylor of command. This is intended as an example to all the other commanders in the department, that if they did not improve their statistics they will also be replaced.

Torret
Played by: Derren M. Fuentes
Appears in
Season one: "The Hunt", "Cleaning Up"
Season two: "Stray Rounds"
Season three: "Middle Ground", "Mission Accomplished"

Lieutenant Torret is a Black officer who appears in charge of the Quick Response Team (QRT) when they are required for raids and arresting criminals. He first appeared in Season 1 leading the search for Savino and then commanding the unit to surround Avon Barksdale's strip club during his arrest. In Season 2, he appeared leading the raid on the Franklin Terrace towers when a nine-year-old child was accidentally shot and killed by a stray round in a shootout between drug dealers. In that raid he had the unit arrest everyone in "The Pit" as he assumed them a suspect for being around that area. 

In Season 3, he appeared at the rank of Major commanding QRT and Tactical units citywide no longer actively participating in the raids. He helped plan and lead the raid to shut down "Hamsterdam" at the orders of Deputy Rawls. He was present with Rawls when finding the body of drug addict Johnny Weeks, who was then taken to the morgue in a squad car as a means of preventing the media from linking the death to the "Hamsterdam" experiment.

Relatives

Cheryl
Played by: Melanie Nicholls-King
Appears in
Season one: "The Target"; "Old Cases"; "The Cost"; "The Hunt" and "Sentencing".
Season two: "Ebb Tide"; "Hard Cases"; "All Prologue"; "Storm Warnings" and "Port in a Storm".
Season three: "All Due Respect" and "Back Burners".
Season four: "Know Your Place"
Season five: "Transitions",
Cheryl is Kima Greggs' live-in partner; she works in the television news industry and often worries about Kima's safety as a police officer. She hopes that Kima will take a less dangerous job and start a family with her. She also appears to do most of the cooking and cleaning in the relationship.

After Kima's shooting, Cheryl insists that Kima take a desk job. Kima acquiesces for a time but eventually returns to investigative work in season 2. Cheryl jealously insists on accompanying Kima when she goes to interview a contact in a strip club. Cheryl finds the assignment hard to understand, until Kima shows her the conditions in which fourteen girls were murdered.

In season 2, Cheryl becomes pregnant by artificial insemination, and in season 3, the couple has a baby boy. Kima begins to spend less time at home, and Cheryl is left to deal with motherhood alone. Kima eventually realizes she does not want to be a parent and moves out of their shared home. Kima is behind on her child support for much of season 4, but gets some overtime in Homicide and visits Cheryl, who is now happy with her new partner.

Elena McNulty
Played by: Callie Thorne
Appears in:
Season one: "Old Cases" and "The Cost".
Season two: "Hot Shots"; "Hard Cases"; "Undertow"; "All Prologue" and "Backwash".
Season three: "Time After Time"; "Hamsterdam" and "Straight and True".
Season four: "Misgivings"
Season five: "React Quotes"

Elena was Jimmy McNulty's wife. They are divorced and have two sons, Sean and Michael.

Elena is angered by Jimmy due to catching him in bed with another woman. She uses her lawyer to try to destroy Jimmy throughout the first season as much as she can. She is also protective of her sons and worries that Jimmy is a dangerous influence on them because of his drinking. When he exposes them to danger by having them tail the subject of his investigation, Stringer Bell, she files for an emergency order to prevent him from seeing the boys. At the court hearing, the judge convinces them to work out arrangements between themselves.

In season two Elena is seen at work as a realtor showing a house to Nick Sobotka. Jimmy tries to initiate a reconciliation with Elena and considerably cleans up his drinking habits and behaviour. The two sleep together, but in the morning Elena asks Jimmy to leave as she feels it would be unfair on her sons for them to see him in the house.

In season three, Elena is established as seriously dating a man named Dennis who sits front row at Orioles games but wears a suit and spends most of the game talking on a cell phone. Jimmy's partner Bunk Moreland suspects that Dennis is a downtown lawyer due to his appearance and mannerisms.

In season four, Elena sees that Jimmy is becoming more stable as a patrolman and states to him that "If I knew you were going to grow up to be a grown up..." suggesting that she wishes she was the one reaping the benefits of this new Jimmy McNulty.

In season five, Elena confronts Jimmy because she notices he is going back to his old ways. She tells him Beadie knows she is losing him just like she, herself, knew back then. She tells him she was actually happy for him that he found Beadie and that he was really turning his life around. She convinces him to try to work things out with Beadie.

Sean James McNulty
Played by: Eric Gershowitz
Appears in:
Season one: "The Wire"; "Lessons" and "Sentencing".
Season two: "Hot Shots".
Season three: "Time After Time"; "Straight and True" and "Slapstick".
Season four: "Misgivings"
Season five: "React Quotes"

Sean is Elena and Jimmy McNulty's oldest son. He lives with his mother and his brother Michael following his parents separation but still sees his father. Jimmy teaches his sons the front and follow technique and when he spots Stringer Bell in a market he has them follow him. Michael and Sean manage to record Stringer's number plate, which aids their father's investigation. In a brief appearance in the fourth season, he says he wants to be a rock star.

Michael Barnes McNulty
Played by: Antonio Cordova
Appears in:
Season one: "Old Cases"; "The Wire" and "Lessons".
Season three: "Time After Time"; "Hamsterdam"; "Straight and True" and "Slapstick".
Season four: "Misgivings"
Season five: "React Quotes"

Michael is Elena and Jimmy McNulty's younger son. He lives with his mother and his brother Sean following his parents separation but still sees his father. Michael plays soccer and Jimmy tries to attend his games. Jimmy teaches his sons the front and follow technique and when he spotted Stringer Bell in a market he had them follow him. Michael and Sean managed to record Stringer's number plate, which aided their father's investigation. In a brief appearance in the fourth season, he says he wants to be a video game designer.

Actual BPD Officers who have appeared
The following is a list of actual Baltimore Police Department officers who have appeared on the show at some point. Many of these officers were either commanders of the department or featured officers in the David Simon's books of The Corner and Homicide: A Year on the Killing Streets.

Gary D'Addario
Recurring character

A former Baltimore Police Department Major who was featured homicide unit shift lieutenant in David Simon's Homicide: A Year on the Killing Streets. He appears recurringly as a grand jury prosecutor named Gary DiPasquale.

Leonard Hamm
Season five: "Not for Attribution"

A former Baltimore Police Department Commissioner who appears as a midnight shift homicide detective in Season 5.

Jay Landsman
Recurring character

A former Baltimore Police Department Sergeant who was featured homicide unit sergeant in David Simon's Homicide: A Year on the Killing Streets. He appears recurringly as Western District Administrative Lieutenant turned Major Dennis Mello.

Edward Norris
Recurring character

A former Baltimore Police Department Commissioner who appears as a recurring character of the same name working as a homicide detective.

Jimmy Rood
Season four: "Boys of Summer"

A Baltimore Police Department C.I.D. Major who appears as a patrolman in Season 4 who encounters mayoral candidate Tommy Carcetti.

Donald Worden
Worden is a former Baltimore Police Department homicide detective featured in David Simon's Homicide: A Year on the Killing Streets who appears as a midnight shift homicide detective in season five. He is also mentioned in episodes in season one ("The Pager"), season three ("Slapstick"), season four ("Margin of Error") and season five ("Not for Attribution").

Other officers mentioned
The following is a list of other Baltimore Police Department officers who have been mentioned on the show at some point. Many of these officers were either commanders of the department or featured officers in the David Simon's books of The Corner and Homicide: A Year on the Killing Streets.

Ed Burns
Mentioned in :Season three: "Slapstick"

A former Baltimore Police Department narcotics detective turned school teacher who co-authored The Corner with David Simon.

Michael Crutchfield
Recurring character of the same name

A former Baltimore Police Department homicide detective mentioned in David Simon's Homicide: A Year on the Killing Streets who inspired a character of the same name played by actor Gregory L. Williams throughout the series.

Richard Garvey
Mentioned in :Season one: "Cleaning Up"
A Baltimore Police Department homicide detective featured prominently in David Simon's 'Homicide: A Year on the Killing Streets'. He is mentioned by his last name as the detective investigating the murder of Nakeysha Lyles.

Vernon Holley
Recurring character of the same name

A former Baltimore Police Department homicide detective mentioned in David Simon's Homicide: A Year on the Killing Streets who inspired a character of the same name played by actor Brian Anthony Wilson throughout the series.

Roger Nolan
Mentioned  in :Season one: "The Target"

A former Baltimore Police Department Sergeant who was featured homicide unit sergeant in David Simon's Homicide: A Year on the Killing Streets. Nolan's name is mentioned as the sergeant of another homicide unit in the department.

Rick Requer
Mentioned in :Season five: "Transitions"

A former Baltimore Police Department homicide detective featured in David Simon's Homicide: A Year on the Killing Streets. He inspired a character named Oscar Requer played by actor Roscoe Orman in Season 5. Requer was the basis for the character of Bunk Moreland.

References